Communauté d'agglomération du Centre de la Martinique is the communauté d'agglomération, an intercommunal structure, centred on the city of Fort-de-France. It is located in Martinique, an overseas department and region of France. It was created in January 2001. Its area is 171.0 km2. Its population was 154,706 in 2018, of which 78,126 in Fort-de-France proper.

Composition
The communauté d'agglomération consists of the following 4 communes:
Fort-de-France
Le Lamentin
Saint-Joseph
Schœlcher

References

Agglomeration communities in France
Intercommunalities of Martinique